Rancher may refer to:

 Someone who owns or works at a ranch
for a list of notable ranchers, see :Category:Ranchers
see also Cowboy
 A Ranch-style house
 Rancher, Montana, a ghost town in the US
 Rancher Labs, a software company
 Rancher, a management platform for Kubernetes container systems

See also
Ranchero (disambiguation)
Ranch (disambiguation)